Rob Manuel (born 5 December 1973) is the English co-founder of the website B3ta (where he is affectionately known as "the Ginger Führer").

Work
Manuel is responsible for numerous quizzes and Flash animations. He has also collaborated with Joel Veitch and Ben Wheatley producing videos for Tomboy Virals. Together with Jonti Picking, under the names Weebl and Chums, he released a mini-album, Pure Yak Frenzy, consisting of various tunes and earworms created by one or both of them. Most of these tracks gained popularity on the Internet (usually accompanied by a Flash animation) before being released on CD. For a time, he presented the B3ta Radio Show on Resonance FM with David Stevenson.

He edited joke website Sickipedia and spin-off book The Bumper B3ta Book of Sick Jokes. The website was accused of plagiarism by comedian Gary Delaney, but added an attribution feature to the website to counter this.

Manuel has developed various Twitter bots, including Clickbait Robot (@clickbaitrobot, which parodies clickbait) and Swear Clock (@swearclock, which tweets the time using profanity).

In 2022, he recorded a mix for the song "Prince Andrew Is a Sweaty Nonce" by The Kunts.

Personal life
Manuel has three children and lives in Tufnell Park, London.

References

External links

 
 interview with the BBC
 

1973 births
Living people
British Internet celebrities
Flash artists